Chris Capossela (born 1969) is Microsoft's Chief Marketing Officer and Executive Vice President of Consumer Business. Capossela's career at Microsoft includes roles as Bill Gates' speech assistant, Corporate Vice President of the Consumer Channels Group and marketing leadership of the company's Microsoft Office group. He also serves as Board Chair of the nonprofit Worldreader.

Education and career 
Capossela graduated from Harvard University in 1991 with a B.A. in economics. He joined Microsoft immediately after graduating, moving from his hometown of Boston to Seattle, WA.

In 1997, Capossela was selected for a two-year assignment as Speech Assistant to Microsoft founder Bill Gates. In 1998, Capossela was doing a demo on stage with Bill Gates at the COMDEX Conference when the computer became unresponsive and displayed the Blue Screen of Death. In 1999, Capossela relocated to Paris to lead business operations for Microsoft's Europe, Middle East and Africa (EMEA) region, before returning to Redmond in 2001 to assume leadership of Microsoft Project. Capossela was promoted to Corporate Vice President of the Microsoft Office division in 2003, a role he held until 2011, when he took on leadership of Microsoft's Consumer Channels Group.

In 2014, Microsoft CEO Satya Nadella promoted Capossela to Chief Marketing Officer, overseeing marketing across consumer and commercial audiences for all Microsoft services and products, corporate communications, brand, advertising and research.  Capossela took over the role from his predecessor Mich Mathews. In 2016, Microsoft consolidated its marketing and consumer sales organizations into the Marketing and Consumer Business group, adding business growth for consumer and device sales, Microsoft Advertising business and Microsoft Stores to Capossela's responsibilities.

Personal life 
Capossela was born and raised in Boston's North End. He worked alongside his two brothers, mother and father at his family's Italian restaurant. His family lived in an apartment above the restaurant. Capossela began attending Harvard in nearby Cambridge, MA, in 1987. Capossela, his wife and two daughters live in Seattle, Washington. Capossela is a board member for a 501(c)(3) global non-profit called Worldreader, an organization that provides people in the developing world with free access to a library of digital books via e-readers and mobile phones.

References 

1969 births
Living people
Chief marketing officers
21st-century American businesspeople
Harvard College alumni
Businesspeople from Boston
American technology executives
Microsoft employees
Businesspeople from Seattle